Gente bien is a 1939  Argentine musical film directed by Manuel Romero. The tango film premiered in Buenos Aires on June 28, 1939 and the United States on October 8, 1939 and starred Hugo del Carril, Tito Lusiardo and Delia Garcés.

The score was composed by Francisco Canaro and Tito Ribero.

Cast
María Armand
Amalia Bernabé
María Esther Buschiazzo
Miguel Caló
Hugo del Carril
Lucy Galián
Delia Garcés
Tito Lusiardo
June Marlowe
Ana May
Nathán Pinzón
Enrique Roldán
Marcelo Ruggero

References

External links 

1939 films
Argentine musical drama films
Argentine black-and-white films
Films directed by Manuel Romero
1930s Spanish-language films
Tango films
1930s musical drama films
1930s dance films
1939 drama films
1930s Argentine films